Melittia acosmetes is a moth of the family Sesiidae. It is known from Uganda.

References

Endemic fauna of Uganda
Sesiidae
Insects of Uganda
Moths of Africa
Moths described in 1919